Korbach Hauptbahnhof is a railway station in the municipality of Korbach, located in the Waldeck-Frankenberg district in Hesse, Germany. It was renamed Hauptbahnhof (main station) in December 2018.

References

Railway stations in Hesse
Buildings and structures in Waldeck-Frankenberg
Railway stations in Germany opened in 1893